Energia subversa is a moth in the family Depressariidae. It was described by Walsingham in 1912. It is found in Mexico (Vera Cruz).

Description 
The wingspan is about 18 mm. The forewings are rather shining, bone-white, with a wash of pale fawn-brownish, from the base to the termen along the dorsal half its margins ill-defined. There is a short brownish fuscous streak to about one-sixth from the base, between the costa and the fold and a shorter streak of the same in the fold a little before its middle, with a small spot on the disc above it, and a strong spot at the end of the cell. This spot lies in the course
of the first of the two oblique, transverse, pale fawn-brownish bands, which, dilated on the middle of the costa, descends obliquely outward to the end of the cell, and is then recurved to the dorsum at two-thirds; the second follows a parallel course, commencing on the costa at three-fourths, both diffused and iU-defined. A series of eight or nine dark brownish fuscous marginal spots occur around the apex and termen. The hindwings are pale brownish grey in females and shining white, with a subcostal hair-pencil in males.

References

Moths described in 1912
Stenomatinae